Ḫedammu, Hurrian Apše ("Snake"), is a sea-dragon from Hurrian-Hittite mythology, which caused trouble on the Syrian coast. His Hittite counterpart was Illuyanka.

The sea-dragon possessed an enormous appetite and nearly consumed the goddess Šauška (dIŠTAR), but was eventually defeated by her charms and she gives birth to snakes from him.

Bibliography 
 Volkert Haas: Die hethitische Literatur. Texte, Stilistik, Motive. Walter de Gruyter GmbH & Co. KG, Berlin etc. 2006, pp. 153 ff.

Hurrian legendary creatures
Hittite legendary creatures
Dragons
Mythological aquatic creatures